Lergotrile is an ergoline derivative which acts as a dopamine receptor agonist. It was developed for the treatment of Parkinson's disease, but failed in clinical trials due to liver toxicity.

References

Chloroarenes
Dopamine agonists
Ergolines
Nitriles
Prolactin inhibitors